Diriks is a surname. Notable people with the surname include:

Carl Frederik Diriks (1814–1895), Norwegian maritime officer, lighthouse director and illustrator
Christian Adolph Diriks (1775–1837), Norwegian lawyer and politician
Christian Ludvig Diriks (1802–1873), Norwegian politician
Edvard Diriks (1855–1930), Norwegian painter
Kâzım Dirik (1881–1941), Turkish general